Franco Zucchi can refer to:

 Franco Zucchi (rower) (born 1965), Italian Olympic rower
 Franco Zucchi (sailor) (born 1917), Italian Olympic sailor